Harald Ernst Malmsten Schering (November 25, 1880 – April 10, 1959) was a German physicist born in Göttingen. He is best known for his work in high voltage electricity and the Schering Bridge used in electrical engineering. Schering was the son of Ernst Schering, mathematician at the Göttingen Observatory. His mother came from a family of Swedish academics who worked with Ernst to translate works from French and Italian. Harald grew up with his two siblings in Göttingen and studied physics at the University of Göttingen. In 1903 he worked at the Geophysical Institute and obtained a Ph.D. in 1904 under Eduard Riecke with work on the Elster-Geitel dispersal apparatus. Beginning in 1905 he was a scientific assistant at the Physics and Technology Institute in Berlin Charlottenburg; today known as the Physikalisch-Technische Bundesanstalt (PTB). His work at the PTB under Emil Warburg primarily dealt with high voltage/high current research and development, and in 1914 he developed a measurement methodology for examining current transformers. In 1914 he was drafted into the First World War and was injured in 1916. In 1918 he became head of the high-voltage lab, succeeding Karl Willy Wagner. In 1919 he attained the title of professor at PTB with an annual salary of 4500 Marks and 1500 Marks as housing allowance. In 1924 he wrote a book on insulators in high voltage. A new institute was established in Hannover, buts construction was delayed by the war. Beginning in 1927, Schering was a professor of electrical engineering and high voltage technology at the Technical University of Hannover (today known as the Leibniz University Hannover). In 1933, he signed the Vow of allegiance of the Professors of the German Universities and High-Schools to Adolf Hitler and the National Socialistic State. He retired in 1949 but continued to work at the PTB until 1954 when Gerhard Pfestdorf took up a position to head the institution.
Schering is remembered for invention of the Schering Bridge, which he developed along with Ernst Alberti is an AC bridge circuit used to measure capacitance and the dissipation factor of capacitors. Schering received a Golden Doctorate from the University of Göttingen in 1954 and an honorary doctorate from Braunschweig. He was awarded the Great Cross of Merit by the Federal Republic of Germany in 1957.

References

External links
 

20th-century German physicists
1880 births
1959 deaths
Commanders Crosses of the Order of Merit of the Federal Republic of Germany
Scientists from Göttingen
20th-century German inventors
Academic staff of the University of Hanover